Buff Farrow (born May 28, 1967) is a former professional tennis player from the United States.

Biography
Born in Wichita, Farrow won the United States Amateur Championships in 1986 and played tennis for the UCLA Bruins. His collegiate career included making both the singles semi-finals and doubles final of the 1988 NCAA Division I Men's Tennis Championships.

Farrow competed in the men's doubles draw at the 1988 US Open with Greg Van Emburgh and made it to the second round, in what would be his only grand slam main draw appearance.

As a professional player he had the biggest win of his career at the 1993 Volvo International in New Haven, where he beat former world number one Mats Wilander, who was making a comeback to the tour.

Challenger titles

Doubles: (1)

References

External links
 
 

1967 births
Living people
American male tennis players
Sportspeople from Wichita, Kansas
Tennis people from Kansas
UCLA Bruins men's tennis players